Power Jets was a British company set up by Frank Whittle for the purpose of designing and manufacturing jet engines.  The company was nationalised in 1944, and evolved into the National Gas Turbine Establishment.

History
Founded on 27 January 1936, the company consisted of Whittle, Rolf Dudley-Williams, James Collingwood Tinling, and Lancelot Law Whyte of investment bankers O T Falk & Partners.

Initial premises were hired from British Thomson-Houston (BTH) at Rugby, Warwickshire.  In addition to the founder members, the company initially 'borrowed' some fitters from BTH to assist in the project and later Power Jets was able to get 'one or two' people on loan from the Royal Air Force.  By the beginning of 1940 the company had a total workforce of about twenty five. In 1938 Power Jets had moved from Rugby to BTH's works in Lutterworth.

A major breakthrough for the company came in 1940 when at the prompting of Stanley Hooker, Ernest Hives, chairman of Rolls-Royce, visited Lutterworth, and offered to make any parts Whittle required at Rolls-Royce's Derby experimental shop.

The Power Jets WU design was the first turbojet to run, being first tested on 12 April 1937, and the Power Jets W.1 powered the Gloster E.28/39, the first jet aircraft to fly in the United Kingdom.  The W.1 was also the first jet engine built in the United States where, as the General Electric I-A, it was the first US-built jet engine to run, and as the production General Electric J31 it powered the Bell P-59A Airacomet.

In 1941 experiments with boosting the W.1's thrust by introducing a liquid coolant were initiated, the first fluid tried being liquid ammonia which proved too effective, resulting in the engine over-speeding and pushing the thrust and rpm indicators off the scales, before later trials changed to using water, and water-methanol. A system to trial the technique in the E.28/39 was devised but never fitted.

The Power Jets W.2 was intended to be produced by Rover, but because of delays was later transferred to Rolls-Royce where it entered production as the Welland, powering early versions of the Gloster Meteor. The W.2B/500 design, modified by Rover as the B.26, after transfer to Rolls-Royce and further re-design, entered service as the Derwent, which replaced the Welland in the Meteor.

After initial suggestions in 1939 by the Engine Department of the Royal Aircraft Establishment (RAE), the latter's Pyestock Section experimented with the technique of injecting fuel into the engine's exhaust nozzle, later known as reheat, and this technique was further refined after Power Jets and the personnel from Pyestock had been amalgamated. Reheat was later flight trialled in the W.2/700 engines in a Meteor I. The technique increased the Meteor's speed by 30-40 mph. The same engine was also trialled with an aft ducted fan.

A version of the Power Jets W.2/700 was intended for the Miles M.52 supersonic research aircraft, but the aircraft was never completed.

On 28 March 1944, after discussions with the Air Ministry, Whittle reluctantly agreed to the nationalisation of Power Jets Ltd. for £135,000, and the company became Power Jets (Research and Development) Ltd.

After the Second World War the company was merged with the Turbine Division of the Royal Aircraft Establishment (RAE) at Farnborough, to form the National Gas Turbine Establishment (NGTE Pyestock).

In 1951 Power Jets received $4,000,000 (£1,428,600) from the US Government in advance payment for US use of some 200 Power Jets Whittle gas turbine patents for the next 20 years. Previously, patent fees payable by the US had been waived by Power Jets for the duration of the war.

The last remnants of the company were disestablished in 1948.

Products

 Power Jets WU: WU abbreviation for Whittle Unit. Series of three experimental test bed engines used to develop the concept of a jet engine. Poor cash flow meant parts were often cannibalised from the previous version. 
 Power Jets W.1: First engine actually designed to fly. Double entry compressor, reverse flow combustor, single-stage axial turbine and convergent nozzle engine configuration. Built by British Thomson-Houston. Propelled Gloster E.28/39 demonstrator aircraft on first flight and subsequent demonstration flights.
 Power Jets WR.1: Co-design with Rolls-Royce (RR) using Power Jets components and RR compressor.
 Power Jets W.1X: Single unit assembled from W.1 spare parts, but not deemed airworthy. Used for taxiing trials (and initial "hop") of Gloster E.28/39. Unit then flown to States to assist General Electric to produce the first US manufactured jet engine. W.1X was the first jet engine to run in the United States.
 Power Jets W.2: More powerful version of  W.1, retaining the same basic configuration.
 Power Jets W.2B: Rover developed version of W2, which after further development as the W.2B/23 went into production as the Rolls-Royce Welland 1. Propelled early versions of the  Gloster Meteor The W.2B also formed the basis of the first GE manufactured jet engine, the General Electric I-A.
Power Jets W.2/500: Revised W.2B. First Power Jets design to meet its design speed on first test run. W.2/500 and Rover B26 formed basis for the straight-through combustor Rolls-Royce Derwent 1, which powered later marks of the Meteor.
Power Jets W.2/700: Improved version of W.2/500 with important changes to the compressor impeller, diffuser and blower casing. Finally attained Whittle's aim of 80% efficiency at a pressure ratio of 4:1. 
 Power Jets W.3X:  Straight-through design. Not built
 250-500 shp turboprop taken up by Coventry Climax as the C.P.35

See also
 Alan Arnold Griffith

References

 
Companies based in Leicestershire
Manufacturing companies established in 1936
Defunct companies of the United Kingdom
Defunct aircraft engine manufacturers of the United Kingdom
Research institutes in Leicestershire
1936 establishments in England
Manufacturing companies disestablished in 1948
1948 disestablishments in England
British companies disestablished in 1948
British companies established in 1936